Tudu Mighty Jets are a Ghanaian professional football club, based in Accra, Greater Accra. They are competing in the 2012–13 Poly Tank Division One League after being relegated at the end of the 2011–12 Glo Premier League season.

History
On 11 May 2010, the club won the play-offs against Nania F.C. in the Poly Tank Division One League Zone III play-offs and climbed into the 2010–11 season of the Glo Premier League.

Current squad

Out on loan

References

External links
 Official site

Football clubs in Ghana
Football clubs in Accra
1994 establishments in Ghana
Association football clubs established in 1994